Vowchurch is a village and civil parish in Herefordshire, England, situated in the Golden Valley, on the River Dore. According to the 2001 census, the parish had a population of 163, increasing to 176 according to the 2011 census.

The place-name 'Vowchurch' is first attested in the Taxatio Ecclesiastica of 1291, where it appears as Fowchirche. The name means 'multi-coloured church', from the Old English fāg meaning 'multi-coloured'. The same derivation is found in Frome Vauchurch in Dorset.

The Grade I listed parish church of St Bartholomew serves a large ecclesiastical parish.

The village was served by Vowchurch railway station from 1881 to 1949.

References

External links 

Golden Valley Community

Villages in Herefordshire